E. arabica  may refer to:
 Emarginula arabica, a sea snail species
 Eremiaphila arabica, the Arabian mantis, an insect species native to the Middle East

See also
 Arabica (disambiguation)